Power (stylised as Power***) is a 2014 Indian Kannada-language action comedy film. It is a remake of the 2011 Telugu film Dookudu which itself was inspired by the 2003 German tragicomedy film Good Bye, Lenin!. It was directed by K. Madesh and produced by Ram Achanta, Gopichand Achanta, and Anil Sunkara for 14 Reels Entertainment. It features Puneeth Rajkumar and Trisha in lead roles, alongside Prabhu, Kelly Dorjee, Rangayana Raghu and Sadhu Kokila in supporting roles. It marked music director, S. Thaman's official musical entry to the Sandalwood Industry.

Plot 
Krishna (Prabhu) is a politician driven by idealistic values and a sense of social service. His followers are his brother Sathya (Dharma), and supporters (Shobharaj, Sharath Lohitashwa). The people of Krishnanna's constituency elect him as a legislator. Krishna, an ardent follower of Dr. Rajkumar, establishes his own independent political empire, consensus with ideals proposed by Rajkumar. Krishna Prasad's dream is to see his son as a politician revered by people. During this time, he meets with a fatal accident, in which his brother and his followers are also killed.

14 years later, Krishna's son Bharath (Puneeth Rajkumar) becomes a daring super-cop in Mumbai. He is on a mission to apprehend mafia don Nayak (Kelly Dorjee), who is involved in illegal drug trade, extortion and arms trafficking. It is later revealed that Krishna actually survived the accident and is comatose. However, this truth is hidden by Krishna's family from the people. Bharath maintains a low profile to apprehend Nayak. In an undercover operation in Spain, Bharath gets hold of Nayak's brother, Bablu. Later, it is revealed that corrupt opposition leader (Doddanna), who is also aiding Nayak, was the mastermind behind Krishna Prasad's accident, and had planned to derail Krishna's political empire as he was opposing his illegal businesses and relation with Nayak.

Bharath falls in love with Prasanthi (Trisha), whom he meets in Spain during his operation. Prasanthi is the daughter of Bharath's higher officer (Avinash), a cop who reports to the police commissioner (Vinod Alwa) in Bangalore city. When Bharath's dad comes out of the coma, doctors advise his family that Krishna is at risk if he encounters or hears anything upsetting, disturbing or shocking. Bharath hides the events surrounding his dad's accident & shifts his family to his dad's previously abandoned mansion, which is now being used for film making.

Bharath creates a dummy political set-up at this mansion. In the guise of a reality television program, Bharath tricks an aspiring but unsuccessful film actor P. Vibhushan (Rangayana Raghu), by making him believe that the television show is being sponsored by film star V. Ravichandran, and that Ravichandran wants to offer P. Vibhushan a very handsome remuneration for his realistic performance in the show. On the other hand, an aspiring actor Kamangi Kidney (Sadhu Kokila) is also tricked by Bharath. Bharath also tricks Gouda with a real estate business deal, to exploit his criminal nexus. Bharath hides this drama from Krishna, by making Krishna believe that Bharath is now an M.L.A., revered by people fulfilling his dad's wishes. He also marries his love, Prasanthi, to make his father happy. The rest of the plot reveals the politician-criminal nexus behind Krishna's accident, the comic misadventures which lead to Krishna learning the truth, and Bharath's retaliation over Nayak and Rudresh's political corruption.

Cast

 Puneeth Rajkumar as Bharat Kumar IPS
 Trisha as Prashanti, Bharat's wife
 Prabhu as Krishna Prasad
 Kelly Dorjee as Nayak
 Rangayana Raghu as P V Bhushan
 Sadhu Kokila as Kidney Kamangi
 Tennis Krishna as Cool
 Thilak Shekar
 Jai Jagadish
 Shobaraj as Bharath's uncle
 Harsha
 Avinash as Bharath's Higher Officer and Prasanthi's father
 Hema as Prashanthi's mother
 Doddanna as Mallesh, Opposition Party Leader
 Shashikumar as Police Commissioner
 Om Prakash Rao
 Bank Janardhan
 Harish Raj as Shastri
 Mandya Ramesh
 Sharath Lohitashwa as Minister Narasimha, Nayak's supporter
 Sunder Raj
 Neetu Chandra in item number "Why Why (Y Y)"
Vinod Alva as New Commissioner

Production
The film, launched in December 2013, is the first Kannada production of the Telugu company 14 Reels Entertainment. It is a remake of Telugu film Dookudu. Tamil actress Trisha made her debut into Sandalwood by starring opposite Puneeth Rajkumar.

There were some troubles related with the titles of the movie. Initially, the film was named Rajakumara, later Puneeth revealed the name as Ashwathama, which was then changed to Power. However, the name was already registered with KFCC, as it went to court. Finally it was changed to Power***.

Filming

Post-Production

Soundtrack 

The soundtrack of the film was composed by S. Thaman and released through Lahari Music label on 28 June 2014. The album consists of five songs. Audio of this movie was launched at Bellary by Telugu actor Mahesh Babu on 29 June 2014. The launch took place at the Bellary Municipal grounds with the presence of Telugu actor Mahesh Babu

Release
The film released 28 August 2014 in 275+ screens including 116 screens in Bangalore alone. The film got 'U/A' certificate with few mutes censor board.

Critical reception
The film received positive reviews from critics as well as audience alike.
Sify stated "With a star-cast this huge and a good technical crew a neat screenplay is expected and this is where the director could have worked on. In spite of being a Telugu remake, director K. Madesh could have put some effort to make it? more local?. Unfortunately director has failed to do the same. Yet, Power Star is definitely worth a watch!" Indiaglitz rated 3.25/5 stated There is no reason for you to miss this film. Desimartini rated 3.5/5 stated Puneeth Rajkumar's powerful performance and Trisha's refreshing screen presence make Power*** an entertaining watch. Though confusing at times, the humor, action and music make the film worth your while. Chitraloka.com rated 3.5/5 stated Another first timer in the film is Kelly Dorjee. He plays the main villain and is a perfect cast. He is menacing and matches Puneeth's heroism with his bad man act. Shivaji Prabhu has become a regular in Kannada films and it is good to see him in such weighty roles. Power*** is the perfect gift for the Ganesha festival you can give yourself and your friends and family. It is a great film to watch in a group.

Box office
The film is the first Kannada film to cross in just 6 days which broke the record of Maanikya.

Officially, the film made Rs 11,02,91,429 in the first 15 days of its release. This, however, excluded the figures for the four districts of the Gulbarga region, for which data was unavailable. The film made more than Rs 8 crore in the first week and expectedly the Bangalore, Mysore, Hubli regions and multiplexes contributed nearly 90 per cent of the revenues. This had become the new benchmark. Trade trackers noted that it was a decent benchmark, considering the smaller market Sandalwood is.

The film had a theatrical run of 100 days in centers across Karnataka.

References

External links 
 

2010s Kannada-language films
2014 films
Kannada remakes of Telugu films
Indian action comedy films
Films shot in Dubai
2014 action comedy films
Films scored by Thaman S
Films shot in Spain
2014 masala films
Films shot at Ramoji Film City
Films shot in Bangalore
Films set in Bangalore
Films set in Spain
Fictional portrayals of the Karnataka Police
2014 comedy films